was a town located in Tsukui District, Kanagawa Prefecture, Japan.

On March 20, 2006, Tsukui, along with the town of Sagamiko (also from Tsukui District), was merged into the expanded city of Sagamihara, and thus no longer exists as an independent municipality. It is now part of Midori-ku, Sagamihara.

As of March 1, 2006, final population data before the amalgamation, the town had an estimated population of 28,551 and a density of 233.9 persons per km2. The total area was 122.04 km2.

References

Dissolved municipalities of Kanagawa Prefecture
Populated places disestablished in 2006
2006 disestablishments in Japan